Amadou Morou (born 22 February 1983) is a Togolese- Polish footballer (midfielder) who plays for UKS SMS Łódź in the regionalized Polish Third League. Morou previously played for Unia Janikowo in the Polish First League. He was born in Lomé.

Clubs 
  ?
 2004  Sparta Brodnica
 2004-2006  Zdrój Ciechocinek
 2006-2008  Unia Janikowo
 2008—  UKS SMS Łódź

References

Togolese footballers
Unia Janikowo players
Association football midfielders
Sportspeople from Lomé
1983 births
Living people
Expatriate footballers in Poland
Togolese expatriates in Poland
21st-century Togolese people